Sam Querrey was the defending champion, but lost in the quarterfinals to Juan Martín del Potro.

Jack Sock won the title after Milos Raonic withdrew from the final due to a hamstring injury.

Seeds

Draw

Finals

Top half

Bottom half

Qualifying

Seeds

Qualifiers

Qualifying draw

First qualifier

Second qualifier

Third qualifier

Fourth qualifier

References

External links
 Main draw
 Qualifying draw

Delray Beach Open - Singles
2017 Singles